Dixie is a rural locality in the Shire of Cook, Queensland, Australia. In the  Dixie had a population of 16 people.

Geography
The locality contains the source of both the Morehead River and Alice River.

History
The Dixie pastoral station is within the locality. It was purchased by the Queensland Government in August 2012. Part of the land will be made into a conservation area to protect the habitat of the endangered golden-shouldered parrot.

In the  Dixie had a population of 16 people.

References

Shire of Cook
Localities in Queensland